He Wei (born December 1955) is a Chinese politician, who is currently a vice chairperson of the Standing Committee of the National People's Congress, and the chairman of the Chinese Peasants' and Workers' Democratic Party. Between 2018 and 2023, he served as a vice chairperson of the Chinese People's Political Consultative Conference.

References

External links 

1955 births
Living people
Heidelberg University alumni
Academic staff of Peking Union Medical College
Members of the Standing Committee of the 11th Chinese People's Political Consultative Conference
Members of the Standing Committee of the 12th Chinese People's Political Consultative Conference
Vice Chairpersons of the National Committee of the Chinese People's Political Consultative Conference
Chinese Peasants' and Workers' Democratic Party politicians
Chinese immunologists
Politicians from Harbin